HD 44120 is a wide binary star system in the southern constellation of Pictor. Although visible to the naked eye, it is a challenge to view having an apparent visual magnitude of 6.44. The system is located at a distance of 118 light years from the Sun based on parallax, but it is drifting closer with a radial velocity of −2 km/s. It has an absolute magnitude of 3.57.

The primary member, designated component A of this system, is an F-type main-sequence star with a stellar classification of F9.5V. It is a Sun-like star and has been considered a "hot" solar analog with a shallower convection zone than the Sun. The estimated age of this star is about four billion years, and it is spinning with a projected rotational velocity of 3.4 km/s. It is chromospherically inactive. The star has 1.2 times the mass of the Sun and 1.6 times the Sun's radius. It is radiating nearly three times the luminosity of the Sun from its photosphere at an effective temperature of 6,005 K.

The faint secondary companion, component C, is a magnitude 14.03 white dwarf star with a class of DB3.2, indicating a helium-rich atmosphere. The object has an effective temperature of ~15,700 K with 67% of the Sun's mass but only 1.3% of the Sun's radius. It has taken  Myr for the white dwarf to have cooled to the current temperature. Prior to leaving the main sequence, this star is estimated to have had  and thus was the system primary. It has an angular separation of  along a position angle of 301.6° from the current primary.

A magnitude 7.61 visual companion, HD 44105, or component B, lies at an angular separation of  along a position angle of 234° from component A, as of 2015. It was discovered as a double star by the Scottish astronomer James Dunlop and announced in 1829.

References

F-type main-sequence stars
White dwarfs
Binary stars
Pictor (constellation)
BD-59 1275
044120
9209
029788
2274